William Edward Collins  (14 October 1853 – 11 August 1934) was a New Zealand doctor, sportsman and politician. He was a member of the New Zealand Legislative Council from 1907 until his death.

Collins was born in Darjeeling, India. His father was John Charles Collins MD and his mother was Ann. He received his education at Cheltenham College in England and at the University of London. He was then at St George's Hospital in London, from where he qualified with FRCS in 1976 and a Bachelor of Medicine in 1877.

His greatest sporting accomplishments were in rugby union; he represented England as a half-back several times in the 1870s, before emigrating to New Zealand. He first arrived in Nelson in April 1877 but by October 1878, he put his land and house up for auction and moved to Wellington.

Collins played two games of first-class cricket for Wellington in the 1880s. Previously he had played for Cheltenham College, and had played against teams captained by W. G. Grace. A. E. J. Collins was his nephew, while his son David Collins played more than 50 first-class matches and his brother John Collins six.

Away from sport, Collins was a notable medical doctor and surgeon in Wellington, having studied at the University of London. In 1884, he was joined by Walter Fell MD in his practice in Wellington. Later, he shared his practice—which was located in Boulcott Street—with Walter Hislop (son of Thomas William Hislop). In WWI he was a Colonel in the New Zealand Medical Corps (NZMC). While on the New Zealand Hospital Ship Maheno in 1915 then serving in the Mediterranean he "raised hackles by denying nurses their officer status and deluding himself that he could command the ship's commander, the master" (Captain McLean). He was appointed Companion of the Order of St Michael and St George in the 1917 New Year Honours.

Collins married on 4 November 1886 at St Paul's Cathedral, Dunedin. It was a double wedding with two sisters of the surname Warren who were granddaughters of the Hon. Matthew Holmes. Collins married Isabella. Arthur Edward Pearce, a son of Col. Edward Pearce, married Annie Vida Kate.

Collins was appointed as a member of the New Zealand Legislative Council (the upper house) from 1907 until he died in Wellington; his membership was renewed in 1914, 1921 and 1928. He died on 11 August 1934 at his home in Wellington's Hobson Street. His funeral service was held at St Paul's Pro-Cathedral followed by cremation at the Karori Cemetery.

Notes

References

External links

1853 births
1934 deaths
19th-century New Zealand medical doctors
20th-century New Zealand medical doctors
Alumni of the London School of Hygiene & Tropical Medicine
England international rugby union players
English emigrants to New Zealand
English rugby union players
Members of the New Zealand Legislative Council
New Zealand Army officers
New Zealand Companions of the Order of St Michael and St George
New Zealand military doctors
New Zealand military personnel of World War I
New Zealand surgeons
People from British India
Wellington cricketers